Happy Hour is a 2003 American comedy drama film starring Anthony LaPaglia and Eric Stoltz.

Plot

Cast
Anthony LaPaglia as Tulley
Eric Stoltz as Levine
Caroleen Feeney as Natalie
Robert Vaughn as Tulley Sr.
Sandrine Holt as Bonnie
Thomas Sadoski as Scott
Jack Newfield as himself
Pete Hamill as himself
Bob O'Brien as himself
Steve Dunleavy as himself

Reception
The film has a 38% rating on Rotten Tomatoes.  Ed Gonzalez of Slant Magazine awarded the film one and half stars out of four.

References

External links
 
 

American comedy-drama films
Films produced by John Davis
2000s English-language films
2000s American films